Charles N. Riotte (January 27, 1814 – May 24, 1887) was an American diplomat who served as US ambassador to Costa Rica and Nicaragua under the administration of Abraham Lincoln and Ulysses S. Grant.

Biography

He was born in  St. Wendel, Prussia. He studied law and served for some time as a judge in Prussia. He also worked as director of a railroad. He emigrated to the United States in 1849 and lived in San Antonio, Texas. By 1854 he became an American citizen.

He met Frederick Law Olmsted in West Texas. Olmsted would later help Riotte secure the post of U.S. minister to Costa Rica in 1861. By 1867, Riotte was appointed as U.S. ambassador to Nicaragua.

He died on May 24, 1887, in Switzerland.

References

1814 births
1887 deaths
Ambassadors of the United States to Costa Rica
Ambassadors of the United States to Nicaragua
People from Sankt Wendel (district)